"Dynamic Tension" is the name Charles Atlas gave to the system of physical exercises that he first popularized in the 1920s. 

Dynamic Tension is a self-resistance exercise method which pits muscle against muscle. The practitioner tenses the muscles of a given body part and then moves the body part against the tension as if a heavy weight were being lifted. Dynamic Tension exercises are not merely isometrics, since they call for movement. Instead, the method comprises a combination of exercises in three disciplines: isotonic, isokinetic, and some exercises in the isometric discipline.

Charles Atlas Ltd., which Atlas incorporated in 1929, owns the trademark for Dynamic Tension.

History

After being bullied as a child, Charles Atlas joined the YMCA and began to do numerous exercise routines. He became obsessed with strength. He said that one day he watched a tiger stretching in the zoo and asked himself, "How does Mr. Tiger keep in physical condition? Did you ever see a tiger with a barbell?" He concluded that lions and tigers became strong by pitting muscle against muscle.

The story may be apocryphal, but it captures the essence of Atlas's innovation. There were many other "isometric" courses available at the time, and sales took off only after Atlas used an advertisement depicting a bully kicking sand in a weakling's face. Some other notable users of this method include Joe DiMaggio, Max Baer, Rocky Marciano, Joe Louis, Robert Ripley and Alan Wells.

Specifically, dynamic tension is a technique very commonly used within martial arts. It refers to the "dynamic tension" literally applied using a person’s movements. Tightening core muscles and applying dynamic tension allows a person to change the tempo of his or her movement. The reconstruction of such movements gives a person more power and speed. That especially becomes useful in performing or sparring. Taking a deep breath, exhaling slowly while tightening the muscles, and sometimes even physically shaking the body part all portray a stronger presence while one performs. Following dynamic tension could be a series of quick movements to pick up the pace.

Dynamic tension is a technique that is universal and can be used on any movement or any style.

See also
Isometric exercise device

References

External links
 Dynamic Tension at charlesatlas.com

Physical culture
Physical exercise
Bodybuilding